is a Prefectural Natural Park in Nagasaki Prefecture, Japan. The park was established in 1962 and derives its name from the Kitamatsuura Peninsula.

See also
 National Parks of Japan

References

Parks and gardens in Nagasaki Prefecture
Protected areas established in 1962
1962 establishments in Japan